The New Zealand Football Championship's 2012–13 season (known as the ASB Premiership for sponsorship reasons) will be the ninth season of the NZFC since its establishment in 2004. The home and away season will begin on 3 November 2012 with the final scheduled to be on 17 March 2013. As a new feature, three games will be played as curtain-raisers to Wellington Phoenix home matches in Westpac Stadium. Auckland City and Waitakere United will represent the ASB Premiership in the 2012–13 OFC Champions League after finishing Minor Premiers and Champions respectively in the 2011–12 competition.

Clubs

League table

Regular season

Round 1

Round 2

Round 3

Round 4

Round 5

Round 6

Round 7

Round 6 Catch Up

Round 8

Round 9

Round 10

Round 11

Round 5 Catch Up

Round 12

Round 13

Round 14

Finals

Semi-finals – first leg

Semi-finals – second leg

Final

Positions by round

 Signals catch-up rounds

Season statistics

Leading goalscorers
Updated to end of regular season

Own goals
Updated to end of regular season

Notes

ASB Premiership Monthly Awards

Attendances

References

External links
 NZFC Website
 2012–13 ASB Premiership Media Guide

New Zealand Football Championship seasons
1
New
New